Clive Goodyear (born 15 January 1961) is an English former footballer who played as a defender. He made 232 appearances in the English Football League for Luton Town, Plymouth Argyle, Wimbledon and Brentford. Goodyear also played in the 1988 FA Cup Final.

Life and career
He started his career at Luton Town, after five years with the Hatters moved to Plymouth Argyle, and after three seasons with Plymouth he moved to Wimbledon. In the 1988 FA Cup Final, in which Wimbledon famously upset Liverpool 1–0, Goodyear was adjudged to have fouled John Aldridge, which gave Liverpool a controversial penalty. Aldridge took it, but Wimbledon goalkeeper Dave Beasant saved it.

Although being named in the squad for that Cup Final, he was not a regular in the side and only made 26 appearances in three years and was sold to Brentford, where he spent one season.

He finished his career in Hong Kong with Ernest Borel. After sustaining a major knee injury he began studying physiotherapy and returned to Luton Town as a physiotherapist in 1993. He was then a physio at Cardiff City and Chester City.

References

1961 births
Living people
Sportspeople from Lincoln, England
English footballers
Association football defenders
Lincoln United F.C. players
Luton Town F.C. players
Plymouth Argyle F.C. players
Wimbledon F.C. players
Brentford F.C. players
Sea Bee players
English Football League players
Luton Town F.C. non-playing staff
Cardiff City F.C. non-playing staff
Chester City F.C. non-playing staff
FA Cup Final players